The Royal Order of Vasa is a Swedish order of chivalry, awarded to citizens of Sweden for service to state and society especially in the fields of agriculture, mining and commerce. It was instituted on 29 May 1772 by King Gustav III. It was unrestricted by birth or education and could therefore be awarded to anyone (as opposed to the Order of the Polar Star, which was intended as a reward for the learned professions). It was the most junior of all the Swedish orders. It was often awarded to Norwegian subjects of the dual monarchy until Oscar I founded the Norwegian Order of St. Olav in 1847. Previously considered dormant from 1974, the order has again been active since 1 February 2023. 

In 2019, a parliamentary committee was instructed to establish guidelines on how to re-introduce the Swedish orders, including the Order of Vasa, into the Swedish honours system and how Swedish citizens again can be appointed to Swedish orders. The committee presented its findings in September 2021 and the Government has declared that a bill on the subejct will be presented to the Riksdag on 19 April 2022. Following the passage of the bill by a large majority on 19 June 2022, on 20 December 2022, the Swedish Government published a new regulation that repealed the 1974 regulation, and once again opened the Royal Orders to Swedish citizens again and reactivated the Sword Order and Vasa Order, which came in effect from 1 February 2023.

The Swedish royal barge Vasaorden takes its name from the order.

Grades
The Order had five classes:

Commander Grand Cross - wears the badge on a collar (chain) or on a sash on the right shoulder, plus the star on the left chest;
Commander 1st Class - wears the badge on a necklet, plus the star on the left chest;
Commander - wears the badge on a necklet;
Knight 1st Class (Member 1st Class for women and clergymen) - wears the badge on a ribbon on the left chest;
Knight (Member for women and clergymen) - wears the badge on a ribbon on the left chest;

Additionally, the Badge of Vasa and the Vasa Medal, were both worn on a ribbon on the left chest.

Insignia and habit
The collar of the Order is of gold, consisted of four sheaves (the emblem of King Gustav Vasa), four white-enamelled nettle leaves each bearing a shield in white above red (the emblem of Holstein, where King Adolf Frederik, the father of King Gustaf III, was born and from which his family, the House of Holstein-Gottorp, took its name) and eight crowned blue shields bearing the Three Crowns, the emblem of Sweden, each flanked by a pair of caduceus and a pair of cornucopia.
The badge of the Order is a white-enameled Maltese Cross, in silver for the Knight class, in gilt for Knight 1st Class and above; crowns appeared between the arms of the cross. The central oval disc, which was identical on both sides, featured a golden sheaf on a black enamel background, surrounded by a red enamel ring bearing the legend Gustaf 3. Instiktare 1772 ("Instituted by Gustaf III, 1772"). The badge hangs from a royal crown. During the early days of the Order, the badge consisted of the oval disc only.
The Badge of Vasa is similar to the knight's silver badge of the Order, but the cross had no white enamel.
The star of the Order is a silver Maltese Cross with a silver sheaf in the centre. That of Grand Cross also had the abovementioned nettle leaf emblem in silver between the arms of the cross.
The ribbon of the Order is green.
Formerly the Order also had a distinctive green and white habit worn on formal occasions such as at chapters of the Order. The habit included green breeches and a green doublet with padded shoulders, both with white piping, a white sash with a gold fringe around the waist and a green mantle with a white lining.  The star of the Order was embroidered over the left breast of both the doublet and the mantle.  A black top hat with gold hat band and a plume of white ostrich and black egret feathers and a pair of green boots with gilded spurs completed the habit.  The collar of the Order was worn over the shoulders of the doublet.

Images

See also
Orders, decorations, and medals of Sweden

References

Further reading 
The MacMillan Company. New York, 1967. Originally published as Europaeiske Ordner I Faever @ Politikens Forlag, 1966. Color plates # 33-37; terxt p. 127.
The Orders of Chivalry from the Original Statutes of the Various Orders of Knighthood and other Sources of Information by J. H. Lawrence-Archer.  London:  W. H. Allen and Company, 13 Waterloo Place, Pall Mall, S. W. Publishers to the India Office.  1887.

External links

The Order of Vasa at the website of the Swedish Royal Court

 
1772 establishments in Sweden
Awards established in 1772